"Paradise Tonight" is a song written by Bill Kenner and Mark Wright, and recorded by American country music artists Charly McClain and Mickey Gilley.  It was released in June 1983 as the second single from the album Paradise.  The song was the most successful of three releases by McClain and Gilley as a duo.  The single went to number one for one week and stayed a total of thirteen weeks on the top 40 country chart.

Charts

Weekly charts

Year-end charts

References
 

1983 singles
1983 songs
Charly McClain songs
Mickey Gilley songs
Male–female vocal duets
Epic Records singles
Songs written by Mark Wright (record producer)
Songs written by Bill Kenner